The Kansas City Roos men's basketball team represents the University of Missouri–Kansas City in Kansas City, Missouri. The school plays in the Summit League after completing a seven-season tenure in the Western Athletic Conference (WAC) in July 2020. The team has never played in the NCAA Division I men's basketball tournament. The Roos are led by head coach Marvin Menzies.

The team returned to Municipal Auditorium for the 2013–14 school year after a brief stint of playing on campus at Swinney Recreation Center.

The team made their first Division I postseason appearance in the 2017 College Basketball Invitational.

Conference affiliations 
 1969–70 to 1985–86 – NAIA Independent
 1986–87 to 1993–94 – NCAA Division I Independent (no team during the 1986–87 school year)
 1994–95 to 2012–13 – Summit League
 2013–14 to 2019–20 – Western Athletic Conference
 2020–21 to Present – Summit League

Athletic brand names 
 Kansas City Kangaroos (1954–1963) — At the time, UMKC was known as the University of Kansas City (short form KCU).
 UMKC Kangaroos (1963–2019) — KCU joined the University of Missouri system in 1963, adopting its institutional name at that time.
 Kansas City Roos (2019–present)

Postseason

CBI
The Roos (then nicknamed Kangaroos) appeared in one College Basketball Invitational (CBI). Their record is 1–1.

NAIA Tournament results
The Kangaroos appeared in one NAIA Tournament. Their record is 0–1.

Former Kangaroos in the NBA
Tony Dumas
Trey McKinney-Jones

References

External links
 Official Website

 
1954 establishments in Missouri
Basketball teams established in 1954